John Myles Dillon (born 15 September 1939) is an Irish classicist and philosopher who was Regius Professor of Greek in Trinity College, Dublin between 1980 and 2006. Prior to that he taught at the University of California, Berkeley. He was elected a corresponding member of the Academy of Athens on 15 June 2010. Dillon's area of research lies in the history of Platonism from the Old Academy to the Renaissance, and also Early Christianity.

Contributions
Among Dillon's most famous works are his translations of Iamblichus' On the Mysteries of the Egyptians, a definitive book on Middle Platonists and Neoplatonism, and his editorial work on Stephen McKenna's translation of Plotinus' Enneads.  With the latter, he continued the same research as his predecessor A. H. Armstrong in the field of Neoplatonic philosophy.

Dillon is also a member of the International Society for Neoplatonic Studies, and is in addition a member of the Editorial Advisory Council of Dionysius. His first novel, The Scent of Eucalyptus, was published in 2007 by the University Press of the South. and in 2020, a fully revised second edition of the novel was published by 451 Editions, Dublin.

Bibliography
 
 .
 .
 .
 .
 .
 .
 .
 .
 .
 .
 .
 .

See also
Numenius of Apamea
Proclus
Porphyry

References

External links
Review of John M. Dillon's The Heirs of Plato: A Study of the Old Academy
International Society for Neoplatonic Studies
Website

Living people
Philosophy academics
Irish classical scholars
Scholars of ancient Greek philosophy
1939 births
Classical scholars of Trinity College Dublin
Classical scholars of the University of California, Berkeley